Shelley Goodman Taub (born July 14, 1939) is a Republican politician from Oakland County, Michigan. She resides in Bloomfield Hills, Michigan.

Biography

Taub was born in Detroit in 1939. She received a B.A. in Education from the University of Michigan. She also did post-graduate work at the University of Missouri and University of Kansas. She is religiously Jewish.

She taught elementary school for 30 years and managed her husband's medical practice. 
She now has three children and five grandchildren.

Political career

County Commissioner

Taub served on the Oakland County Commission from 1983 until 2002 and again from 2009 until 2019. She represented two-thirds of West Bloomfield Township, one-third of Bloomfield Township, and the cities of Keego Harbor, Orchard Lake Village and Sylvan Lake. As commissioner she chaired many activities including the Prescription Task Force, the Children's Summit and the Senior Summit.

State Representative

Legislative history

Taub was elected to represent the 40th District in the Michigan House of Representatives in 2002. The district includes Bloomfield and Southfield townships; the cities of Birmingham Bloomfield Hills, Keego Harbor, Orchard Lake Village and Sylvan Lake; and the villages of Beverly Hills, Bingham Farms and Franklin.

As a State Representative Taub focused on healthcare and education. In particular, Taub sponsored legislation capping malpractice suit contingency fees.

While serving in the Michigan House of Representatives, Taub was Chair of the Appropriations' Committee on Transportation. She also was assistant Republican Caucus Chair.

2006 State Senate campaign

In 2006, Taub campaigned for a seat in the 13th District of the Michigan Senate. Originally, the Republican primary race was supposed to be between former her and former Rep. Robert Gosselin in a moderately safe Republican district. When Democrat Andy Levin entered the race, however, Republicans feared that his name recognition and fundraising ability (as the son of an Oakland County Congressman and nephew of Michigan's Senator) in the county could make the seat much more competitive.

After John Pappageorge joined the race, Gosselin dropped out in order to run for County Commissioner in Troy.

The competition between Pappageorge and Taub was characterized in the media as fierce. Taub claimed that if she had known that Pappageorge was going to run for the Senate, she would not have run. She put Pappageorge's name as an endorser on about 20,000 fliers that were sent throughout the district. She also claimed that Pappageorge received illegal support from the Senate GOP through the New Century Fund, a political action committee (PAC) without any campaign history that funded campaign material on behalf of Pappageorge.

Pappageorge won the August Republican primary 58.5% to Taub's 41.5%.

Shelley Goodman Taub was re-elected as Oakland County Commissioner in 2008, winning back her old seat.

References

1939 births
Living people
Politicians from Detroit
People from Bloomfield Hills, Michigan
University of Michigan School of Education alumni
University of Missouri alumni
University of Kansas alumni
County commissioners in Michigan
Republican Party members of the Michigan House of Representatives
Women state legislators in Michigan
21st-century American women